James Rigby is Chief Executive of SCC, Rigby Group's IT services business.

Rigby joined SCC in 1997 in the Engineering Services division, and was appointed to run the Technology Sourcing division in 1995. Subsequently, he was made General Manager and has taken on responsibility for service delivery operations across Europe and playing a major role in all Group acquisitions.
He now heads SCC's operations in the UK, France, Spain, Romania and the Netherlands.

References

British chief executives
Living people
Year of birth missing (living people)